Dewa Made Beratha (born July 12, 1941 in Gianyar, Bali) is the former governor of Bali. He is a member of the PDI-P, and allied to Megawati Sukarnoputri. On 2008 Balinese Governor Election, Beratha has been replacing by Made Mangku Pastika.

Early life
He received his degree from Gajah Mada University in Social Politic Faculty.

Work 
He started his career in 1967 as Secretary Officer of Bangli Regency. From 1968 he was the Relieving Mayor of Bangli for another two years. He was a member of parliament and the Bali government from 1970 to 1998. In 1998, he was elected to his first term as Governor of Bali, and in 2003 he was elected for his second term.

Elections
He was elected in 1998 to the governorship. In 2003, the people of Bali elected him for a second term.

Family
He is married to I Gusti Agung Ayu Mas and has four children: Dewa Gde Joni Asta Brata, Dewa Gde Juli Arta Brata, Desak Nyoman Anggreni, and Dewa Gde Darma Putra.

References

1941 births
People from Gianyar Regency
Balinese people
Living people
Gadjah Mada University alumni
Indonesian Hindus
Governors of Bali
Indonesian Democratic Party of Struggle politicians
Politicians from Bali